Class 79 may refer to:

 DRG Class 79, a German tank locomotive class with the pre-war Deutsche Reichsbahn and the post-war East German Deutsche Reichsbahn, comprising:
 Class 79.0: Saxon XV HTV (1925–1933)
 Class 79.0II: BLE No. 44 (1938–1947)
 Class 79.0III: SNCF 1-242.TA.6xx, ex-Alsace-Lorraine T 20 taken over by the DR (1952–1963)